Khadra Bashir Ali was a Somali politician. and she comes from the Leelkase a sub-clan of the Darod clan.She was the former Minister of Education of Somalia, having been appointed to the position on 27 January 2015 byformer Prime Minister Omar Abdirashid Ali Sharmarke. Khadra Bashir Ali was subsequently sacked from her post as Minister of Education by former Prime Minister Omar Abdirashid Ali Sharmarke and replaced with Abdulkadir Abdi Hashi on 24 June 2016. Khadra died in October 2021.

References

Year of birth missing (living people)
Living people
Government ministers of Somalia
2021 deaths